Nur Mohammad Mondal is a Bangladesh Nationalist Party politician and the former Member of Parliament from Rangpur-6.

Career
Mondal was elected to Parliament from Rangpur-6 in 1996 as a Jatiya Party candidate. He was re-elected to Parliament in 2001 as an Islami Jatiya Oikya Front candidate beating his closest opponent, Sheikh Hasina of Bangladesh Awami League. He contested the 2008 election as a Bangladesh Nationalist Party candidate but lost to Sheikh Hasina. In 2014, he was elected Chairman of Pirganj Upazila Parishad of Rangpur District.

References

Bangladesh Nationalist Party politicians
Living people
10th Jatiya Sangsad members
Year of birth missing (living people)